This is a list of airlines currently operating in Israel.

Scheduled airlines

International and domestic

Domestic

Cargo

See also
 List of defunct airlines of Israel
 List of airports in Israel
 List of defunct airlines of Asia
 List of airlines

Israel
Airlines
Airlines
Israel